Hacketstown (IPA:[ˈbˠalʲəˈhaceːdʲ]), historically known as Ballydrohid, is a small town in County Carlow, Ireland, near the border with County Wicklow.

It is located on the R747 regional road at its junction with the R727. The River Derreen flows westwards just north of the town and the River Derry rises just south of the town.

History
In the early thirteenth century, an Anglo-Norman castle was built on the site where St Brigid's Church sits now.

In the seventeenth century the wealthy Chetham family from New Moston, Lancashire, England acquired lands here. Although they lived mainly in England, a Chetham daughter married into the powerful Irish Loftus family.

Hacketstown was the scene of two battles during the 1798 rebellion.

Hacketstown has a national school and secondary school, Coláiste Eoin. There is a Roman Catholic church, St Bridget's, and a Church of Ireland chapel, St John's.

William Presley, an ancestor of Elvis Presley, was a resident of the town before emigrating to America over 200 years ago.

In 2011, the US town of Hackettstown, New Jersey, declared a sister city relationship with Hacketstown.

See also
 List of towns and villages in the Republic of Ireland

References

Towns and villages in County Carlow